Badaruddin Malik (born 1922) is an Indian former cricketer. He played first-class cricket for several domestic teams in India and Pakistan between 1943 and 1954.

See also
 List of Delhi cricketers

References

External links
 

1922 births
Possibly living people
Indian cricketers
Delhi cricketers
Karachi cricketers
Northern India cricketers
Sindh cricketers
Southern Punjab cricketers
Cricketers from Amritsar